Oakgrove may refer to:

in England
Oakgrove, Cheshire
Oakgrove, Milton Keynes

in Ireland
Oakgrove Integrated College, Derry, Northern Ireland

in the United States
McGehee-Stringfellow House, a former plantation known as Oakgrove, near Greensboro, Alabama

See also
Oak Grove (disambiguation)